The 1972 NCAA University Division Golf Championship was the 34th annual NCAA-sanctioned golf tournament to determine the individual and team national champions of men's collegiate golf in the United States.

The tournament was held at the Cape Coral Golf Club in Cape Coral, Florida.

Defending champions Texas won the team championship, the Longhorns' second NCAA title.

Individual results

Individual champions
 Ben Crenshaw, Texas
 Tom Kite, Texas

Team results

Note: Top 10 only
DC = Defending champions
First time qualifiers: Georgia Southern

References

NCAA Men's Golf Championship
Golf in Florida
NCAA Golf Championship
NCAA Golf Championship
NCAA Golf Championship